Fernando Cavallini may refer to:

 Fernando Cavallini (fencer) (1893–1976), Italian fencer
 Fernando Cavallini (wrestler) (1898–?), Italian wrestler